Graham Dawbarn CBE FRIBA FRAeS (8 September 1893 – 30 January 1976) was a British architect most notable for designing the Television Centre, London, the redevelopment of Imperial College and an impressive variety of British interwar airport/aerodrome buildings.

Biography
Dawburn was born in London 8 September 1893, the son of R. A. Dawburn, a Civil Engineer. He was educated at The King's School, Canterbury and at Corpus Christi College, Cambridge, reading Maths Part 1 and then Architectural Studies in 1914. He served in the Royal Flying Corps and after the War he returned to Cambridge and assisted Professor E S Prior in the Architecture School. In 1920–21 he worked in the office of the Architect Arthur Keen (1861–1938) and passed the war final RIBA examination in 1921.

 1921-1923 he worked in the Public Works Department in Hong Kong.
 1924 won in open competition the design for Raffles College with Cyril Farey. This was the forerunner of the National University of Singapore and is now the older building of their Faculty of Law
 1931 Flew 8,000 miles in a light aeroplane with Nigel Norman in the US studying airports
 1931/32 Designed the Brooklands Aero Clubhouse, officially opened on 28 May 1932 
 1933 Founded Norman and Dawbarn where he remained a senior partner until 1958
 1945-47 President of the Architectural Association and member of the RIBA Council
 1948 awarded the CBE in the 1948 Birthday Honours List
 1951 won 2 Architectural Awards from the Council of the Festival of Britain.
 1956 the foundation stone for BBC Television Centre was laid
 1960 Her Majesty the Queen formally opened Television Centre  
He married Olive Topham in 1923 and they had two daughters

Professional career
In partnership with Sir Nigel Norman he designed airport buildings at Heston, Birmingham, Jersey, Guernsey, Manchester and Wolverhampton. After Norman's death in a flying accident during World War II, Dawbarn continued the practice on his own. The firm, Norman and Dawbarn, was purchased by Capita in 2005

In the late 1920s and early 1930s he collaborated with Alan Muntz in an airport consultancy firm called Norman, Muntz and Dawbarn, and with Norman he made a tour of airports around the world to make recommendations to RIBA on airport design.

Television Centre
The BBC commissioned him to design its new home for television. According to Louis Barfe:

In 2020 Television Centre was officially 60 years old and a commemorative film was made by the Royal Television Society to celebrate, featuring Philip Schofield (who as a child had always wanted to work in the building)

Imperial College
In 1956 Dawbarn was engaged to redevelop Imperial College, demolishing the late Victorian Imperial Institute in South Kensington. In response to public outcry in 1956 he said: "Change is usually sad, but it is dangerous to live too much in the past, and to overstate the past at the expense of the future." There was so much opposition to the original scheme that a new one was proposed in 1958 which kept the highly symbolic clock tower of the old Imperial Institute.

Airport buildings
Early in his career, after a study tour of American airports, Dawbarn designed various impressive airport/aerodrome buildings at Heston, Brooklands, Birmingham, Jersey, Guernsey, Manchester and Wolverhampton.

Other buildings
Other notable buildings include:
 The Institute of Medical Psychology 
 The Wilton Estate in Dalston 
 The Froebel Educational Institute at the University of Roehampton
 Makerere University College (now Makerere University), Kampala: students' hall of residence
 Secondary School, College Road, Cheshunt, Hertfordshire 
 University of Dar es Salaam

References

1893 births
1976 deaths
20th-century English architects
Place of death missing
Alumni of the University of Cambridge
Commanders of the Order of the British Empire
Fellows of the Royal Institute of British Architects
Fellows of the Royal Aeronautical Society